In differential geometry, a Lie group action is a group action adapted to the smooth setting: G is a Lie group, M is a smooth manifold, and the action map is differentiable.



Definition and first properties 
Let  be a (left) group action of a Lie group G on a smooth manifold M; it is called a Lie group action (or smooth action) if the map  is differentiable. Equivalently, a Lie group action of G on M consists of a Lie group homomorphism . A smooth manifold endowed with a Lie group action is also called a G-manifold. 

The fact that the action map  is smooth has a couple of immediate consequences:

 the stabilizers  of the group action are closed, thus are Lie subgroups of G
 the orbits  of the group action are immersed submanifolds.

Forgetting the smooth structure, a Lie group action is a particular case of a continuous group action.

Examples 
For every Lie group G, the following are Lie group actions:
the trivial action of G on any manifold
the action of G on itself by left multiplication, right multiplication or conjugation
 the action of any Lie subgroup  on G by left multiplication, right multiplication or conjugation

the adjoint action of G on its Lie algebra .

Other examples of Lie group actions include:
more generally, any Lie group representation on a vector space
any Hamiltonian group action on a symplectic manifold
the transitive action underlying any homogeneous space
more generally, the group action underlying any principal bundle

Infinitesimal Lie algebra action 
Following the spirit of the Lie group-Lie algebra correspondence, Lie group actions can also be studied from the infinitesimal point of view. Indeed, any Lie group action  induces an infinitesimal Lie algebra action on M, i.e. a Lie algebra homomorphism . Intuitively, this is obtained by differentiating at the identity the Lie group homomorphism , and interpreting the set of vector fields  as the Lie algebra of the (infinite-dimensional) Lie group .

More precisely, fixing any , the orbit map  is differentiable and one can compute its differential at the identity .

Conversely, by Lie–Palais theorem, any abstract infinitesimal action of a (finite-dimensional) Lie algebra on a compact manifold can be integrated to a Lie group action.

Moreover, an infinitesimal Lie algebra action  is injective if and only if the corresponding global Lie group action is free. On the other hand,  in general not surjective. For instance, let  be a principal G-bundle: the image of the infinitesimal action is actually equal to the vertical subbundle .

Proper actions 
An important (and common) class of Lie group actions is that of proper ones. Indeed, such a topological condition implies that

 the stabilizers  are compact
 the orbits  are embedded submanifolds
 the orbit space  is Hausdorff

In general, if a Lie group G is compact, any smooth G-action is automatically proper. An example of proper action by a not necessarily compact Lie group is given by the action a Lie subgroup  on G.

Structure of the orbit space 
Given a Lie group action of G on M, the orbit space  does not admit in general a manifold structure. However, if the action is free and proper, then  has a unique smooth structure such that the projection  is a submersion (in fact,  is a principal G-bundle).

The fact that  is Hausdorff depends only on the properness of the action (as discussed above); the rest of the claim requires freeness and is a consequence of the slice theorem. If the "free action" condition (i.e. "having zero stabilizers") is relaxed to "having finite stabilizers",  becomes instead an orbifold (or quotient stack).

An application of this principle is the Borel construction from algebraic topology. Assuming that G is compact, let  denote the universal bundle, which we can assume to be a manifold since G is compact, and let G act on  diagonally. The action is free since it is so on the first factor and is proper since G is compact; thus, one can form the quotient manifold  and define the equivariant cohomology of M as
,
where the right-hand side denotes the de Rham cohomology of the manifold .

See also 
Hamiltonian group action
Equivariant differential form
isotropy representation

References 

Michele Audin, Torus actions on symplectic manifolds, Birkhauser, 2004
John Lee, Introduction to smooth manifolds, chapter 9, 
Frank Warner, Foundations of differentiable manifolds and Lie groups, chapter 3, 

Group actions (mathematics)
Lie groups